Fouad Abou Nader is a Lebanese Christian politician and former leader of the Lebanese Forces. A grandson of the Kataeb Party founder Pierre Gemayel, Abou Nader became a Kataeb party activist and head of the elite Kataeb troop called the "BG" and later on head of the Lebanese Forces after the union of various Christian military groupings. After an internal revolt in the Lebanese Forces led by Elie Hobeika and Samir Geagea against his leadership, he relinquished his power to them refusing to what he considered a fratricide venture.

Abou Nader remained active in Lebanese Forces veterans group and return briefly to the Kataeb party that was marred at the time by deep divisions between various factions of the party before leaving disenchanted. He eventually established his own political movement, Liberty Front that he heads as general coordinator.

He was seriously injured in 1975, 1976 and 1983 in fights against Palestinians and Syrians and in 1986 survived an assassination attempt and was severely wounded. In the late 1980s, he also established his own medical and paramedical engineering firm.

Early life
Nader was born in Baskinta, (Metn, Mount-Lebanon, Lebanon) on June 27, 1956, a Christian Maronite and the Son of Antoine Abou Nader and Claude Pierre Gemayel.

After attending school at Collège Notre-Dame de Jamhour and Collège Mont La Salle, he joined the American University of Beirut. Because of the war, he continued his medical studies at the Université Saint-Joseph from which he graduated as a doctor in 1982.

Kataeb Party activist

He joined the Kataeb Social Democratic Party (led by his grandfather Sheikh Pierre Gemayel) in 1974. He was an active member of both the paramilitary and the students’ organization of the party. At Dekwaneh, he participated in his first fight against the Palestinian organizations.

Lebanese Forces fighter and commander

When war started, he was part of the elite troop, the “BG” (or “BE GiM”), inside of the Kataeb regular forces. When the Kataeb Regulatory Forces (KRF), the Tigers Militia (“Noumour”) from the National Liberal Party, the “Guardians of the Cedars” from the National Lebanese Movement and the “Al-Tanzim” (“the Organization”) from the Lebanese Resistance Movement united in the “Lebanese Forces” (LF), he became the head of the operations (called “Third Bureau”) of the LF. He was seriously injured in 1975, 1976, 1983 and 1986. For the latter, he survived to an assassination attempt and was severely wounded.

In 1982, Bachir Gemayel, commander in chief of the LF was elected as Lebanese Republic president. So, Fadi Frem became commander in chief and Dr Fouad Abou Nader, chief of staff of the LF. In 1984, he was elected as commander in chief of the LF. He was involved in almost all the battles with the Resistance against the Palestinian organizations & the Syrian army. He became famous for his tenacious nerves, physical courage, exceptional organization and planning skills. For his fellow fighters he was a living legend: no battle was won without him. He was the initiator & creator of most of the LF elite troops.

After his election to the presidency, Bachir Gemayel said: “If I had to deliver a Resistance medal of honour, I would have certainly given it to the greatest fighter of our Resistance, Fouad Abou Nader.”

Power struggles and withdrawal from the Lebanese Forces

From 1985, an era of “intifada” (revolts) shook the “free regions” and diverted the Cause of its strategic objectives in turning into a struggle for power. Dr Fouad Abou Nader refused the bloody logic: he did not put down the intifada led by Elie Hobeika & Dr Samir Geagea against him, “When I offer my condolences to the family of a martyr as head of the LF I feel bad even if their son was sacrificed for the noblest of causes. What do you want me to say tomorrow to all these mothers? How to explain the martyrdom of their children? Just to remain in my position as head of the LF?” In 1986, he refused the tripartite agreement signed in Damascus by Elie Hobeika and became responsible for the Kataeb regional. Then, in 1989, he refused the Taef agreement signed by Dr Georges Saade, the head of the Kataeb Social Democratic Party and approved by Dr Samir Geagea. He supported Michel Aoun’s liberation war against the Syrian army but rejected the fratricide war between the Lebanese Army soldiers loyal to General Aoun and Geagea’s militia. He participated to the mass demonstrations in Baabda (where is located the presidential palace) against Taef agreement and Syrian army invasion. The internal struggles inside of the LF and the fratricide war between Aoun soldiers and Geagea militiamen were fatal - it was real self-destruction.

Lebanese Forces Veterans Group and return to Kataeb

During Syrian occupation, he helped the student Resistance, participated to their main demonstrations and was part of the "Kataeb Opposition" led by Dr Elie Karame, former head of the Kataeb, against the pro-Syrian direction of the party led by Dr Georges Saadeh then Mounir Hajj and Karim Pakradouni. After Rafic Hariri assassination, he participated to the mass demonstrations in Beirut downtown for the departure of the Syrian army.

After Syrian withdrawal, he restarted his public activities in launching, with his former companions, the "Lebanese Forces Veterans Group". He decided to return to the Kataeb in the hope of initiating the necessary changes to avoid the repetition of the mistakes of the past. These necessary changes were: making the party more democratic to avoid fratricidal struggles for power and redefining the Cause. Quickly, he clashed with the direction of the party who refused any change about the feudal, hereditary and therefore anti-democratic structures.

Establishment of the Liberty Front

Consequently, in collaboration with his companions from the Kataeb Social Democratic Party, as well as from other parties and movements, Fouad Abou Nader launched the “Liberty Front” in April 2007. The Liberty Front is a Lebanese political movement, social-democratic & independent, heir of the “Front for Freedom & Man” founded in 1976 by Dr. Charles Malik and the political offspring of the Resistance of the Front's parties & movements fighters who cooperated in the “Lebanese Forces Command Council”. Starting 1976 before uniting their guns in 1980 in the “Lebanese Forces” under the leadership of President Bachir Gemayel and fought against the Palestinian organizations & the Syrian army between 1975 and 1986.

The Liberty Front calls for the Christian unity rejecting the division of the Christians. In October 2008, Abounader was re-elected as general coordinator of the Liberty Front.

Positions
Dr. Fouad Abou Nader thinks that friendly relations with both Syria and Israel will maybe not start in the near future “but definitely in the end we have to find a resolution. Why can’t we achieve peace between our countries? Our peace has to be fair between the Israelis and us and between Syria and us as well.”

He is “100% for keeping this coexistence between Christians and Muslims in Lebanon, but the political formula of how to implement it must be changed. We would like to find a final solution for the problems of the country. Otherwise we are going to stay in this situation. We cannot go on like this for all of our lives. We have to try a stable solution for the sake of our kids. We don't want our kids to continue the war we have fought. We want to find a final solution. Rule number one is that we have to stop lying to each other. Number two, we have to start thinking Lebanese only. And, rule number three, we need to sit together and find a solution – without a hidden agenda from either side. Everyone in Lebanon, Christians, Sunnis, Shiites, Druze, Alawi, Jews, etc. can live free with dignity and enjoy security, equality and freedom.”

About the Memorandum of Understanding between Aoun's Free Patriotic Movement & Hezbollah, his position is: “It's a positive step although I don't agree with the objectives of Hezbollah and its foreign agenda.” As “defence strategy” option, he is for the creation of a “national guard”, an armed force organised regionally, in the framework of the regionalism he is calling for, alongside the Lebanese army and Interior Security Forces (I.S.F.) and integrating Hezbollah Resistance weapons and fighters but also other and new volunteers from all the regions and from all the sects.

Other activities
Abou Nader is chairman of Omega Group.  Omega Group was established in 1987.  It is a trading and distributing company specialized in the medical field. It has developed an extensive network of connections in many parts of the world such as Nigeria. Omega Group represents several international manufacturers of medical equipment and supplies and specialized consultant companies in the medical field.

References

External links

Liberty Front Official Website
Lebanese Forces Resistance Official Website
Kataeb Social Democratic Party Official Website
Fouad Abou Nader autobiography first part (audio/video)
Fouad Abou Nader autobiography second part (audio/video)
Fouad Abou Nader autobiography third part (audio/video)
Fouad Abou Nader autobiography fourth part (audio/video)
Fouad Abou Nader autobiography fifth part (audio/video)
Fouad Abou Nader autobiography sixth part (audio/video)
Fouad Abou Nader autobiography seventh part (audio/video)

Abou Nader, Fouad
Kataeb Party politicians
Living people
1956 births
Saint Joseph University alumni
Lebanese Maronites